Richard Hamilton may refer to:

Military 
Richard Hamilton (officer) (died 1717), Irish officer
Richard Hamilton (Medal of Honor) (1836–1881), American Civil War sailor
Richard Vesey Hamilton (1829–1912), British admiral and First Naval Lord

Sportsmen 
Richard Hamilton (boxer), competed at the Boxing at the 1988 Summer Olympics for Jamaica
Richard Hamilton (basketball) (born 1978), American basketball player
Richard Hamilton (rower) (born 1973), British Olympic rower
Rick Hamilton (Richard R. Hamilton, born 1970), American football player

Others 
Richard Hamilton, 4th Viscount Boyne (1724–1789), Irish MP for Navan
Richard Hamilton (actor) (1920–2004), American actor
Richard Hamilton (artist) (1922–2011), British painter and collage artist
Richard Hamilton (BBC journalist), author of 2011 book The Last Storytellers
Richard S. Hamilton (born 1943), American mathematician
Richard Hamilton (mining) (1855–1943), mine manager at Boulder, Western Australia
Richard Hamilton (winemaker) (1792–1852), founder of winery in South Australia

See also
Richard Hamilton Rawson